Jorge López Astorga (born October 30, 1991) is a Chilean actor. Born in Llay Llay, Chile, his first major role was in the Disney Channel Latin American telenovela Soy Luna (2016–2018). López played Valerio Montesinos in the Netflix series Elite. Valerio is Lu's half-brother.

He studied acting at the Universidad de Artes, Ciencias y Comunicación.

Filmography

References

External links 
 

1991 births
Living people
People from San Felipe de Aconcagua Province
Chilean male television actors
Chilean male film actors
21st-century Chilean male actors